Ser or SER may refer to:

Places
 Ser, a village in Bogdand Commune, Satu Mare County, Romania
 Serpens (Ser), an astronomical constellation of the northern hemisphere
 Serres, known as Ser in Serbian, a city in Macedonia, Greece

Organizations
 Social-Economic Council (Sociaal-Economische Raad, SER) of the Dutch government
 Society for Ecological Restoration (SER)
 Society for Epidemiologic Research, North America

Science and technology 
 Ser (unit), an obsolete unit of volume in India
 Sequence of events recorder
 Serine (Ser), an ɑ-amino acid in biochemistry
 Single-ended recuperative burner, a type of gas burner
 SIP Express Router
 Smooth endoplasmic reticulum, in cell biology
 Soft error rate, in computing
 Ser., taxonomic author abbreviation of Nicolas Charles Seringe (1776–1858), French physician and botanist

Transport
 SER, IATA code for Freeman Municipal Airport, Seymour, Indiana, U.S.
 SER, MRT station abbreviation for Serangoon MRT station, Singapore
 SER, National Rail code for St Erth railway station in Cornwall, UK
 South Eastern Railway (England), UK
 South Eastern Railway zone, India

Other uses
 SER (magazine), Nicaragua
 ser, ISO 639-3 language code for Serrano language
 Cadena SER (SER network), a Spanish radio network
 Darren Cullen (graffiti artist), a graffiti artist known by the tag name SER

See also
Serr
Sir (disambiguation)